Triumphene is a fluorinated and phenylated fullerene derivative.  It was first synthesized in 1998 by Boltalina, Street, and Taylor by reaction of C60F18 in a benzene-FeCl3 solution for two weeks at room temperature.  It is the first trefoil-shaped phenylated [60]fullerene, providing a unique scaffold for the potential use in nanoscale imaging agents.

References

Organofluorides
Substances discovered in the 1990s